Fredericks Goldman Jones is a 1990 album recorded by the trio Fredericks Goldman Jones. It was the trio's first studio album and was recorded at the studios ICP and Guillaume Tell, in Paris. The album was released on 28 November 1990 and spawned six singles which achieved success in France : "Nuit" (#6), "À nos actes manqués" (#2), "Né en 17 à Leidenstadt" (#11), "C'est pas l'amour" (#11), "Un, deux, trois" (#8) and "Tu manques" (#12). The album itself was successful : it debuted at number one on 4 January 1991 and stayed there for eight consecutive weeks. It was ranked for 51 weeks in the top ten and 87 weeks in the top 50. In 1991, it earned a Diamond disc for over 1,000,000 copies sold.

Track listing
All tracks written and composed by Jean-Jacques Goldman.
All tracks performed by Carole Fredericks, Jean-Jacques Goldman and Michael Jones, except "Tu manques" (Goldman only).

 "C'est pas d'l'amour" — 4:57
 "Vivre cent vies" — 4:41
 "Né en 17 à Leidenstadt" — 3:54
 "Un, deux, trois" — 4:18
 "Nuit" — 5:40
 "Je l'aime aussi" — 6:14
 "Chanson d'amour (...!)" — 4:07
 "À nos actes manqués" — 4:42
 "Peurs" — 4:58
 "Tu manques" — 9:13

Source : Allmusic.

Personnel
 Nicole Amovin, Carole Fredericks, Julia Fenere Sarr – choir, chorus
 Gildas Arzel – acoustic guitar, guitar
 Alain Aubert, John Hastry – engineer, mixing
 Georges Baux, Jean Louis Pujade, Andy Scott – producer
 Erick Benzi – synthesizer, keyboards, producer
 Simon Clarke, Kick Horns, Roddy Lorimer, Neil Sidwell – brass
 Jean-Yves d'Angelo – piano
 Claude Gassian – photo
 Jean-Jacques Goldman – guitar, harmonica, piano, arranger, choir, chorus, producer
 Michael Jones – guitar, electric guitar, choir, chorus, co-arranger
 Basil Leroux, Patrice Tison – guitar
 Pino Palladino – bass
 Gerald Manceau, Claude Salmieri – drums
 Tim Sanders – soprano saxophone, brass
 Paul Spong – trumpet, brass

Certifications

References

1990 debut albums
Jean-Jacques Goldman albums
Carole Fredericks albums
CBS Disques albums